The British S-class submarine of 1914 were built by Scotts, Greenock just before World War I. The S class was based on an Italian design of the Laurenti boats.

The design had ten internal bulkheads.

Three vessels were constructed. All three were transferred to the Italian Navy in October 1915.

Members of the class

References

 

S class submarine, British, 1914